The Central African Republic has a multi-party system, with two or three strong parties and a third party that is electorally successful.

Parties

Current parties

Parliamentary parties

Other parties 
 Alliance for Democracy and Progress
 Central African Republican Party
 Civic Forum
 Democratic Forum for Modernity
 Liberal Democratic Party
 Löndö Association
 Movement for Democracy and Development
 National Unity Party
 Patriotic Front for Progress
 People's Union for the Republic
 Social Democratic Party
 Union of Democratic Forces for Unity

Former parties 
 Central African Democratic Union
 Movement for the Social Evolution of Black Africa

Footnotes 



 
Central African Republic
Central African Republic
Political parties
Political parties